Jhikardanga is a village in Bhatar CD block in Bardhaman Sadar North subdivision of Purba Bardhaman district in the state of West Bengal, India with total 120 families residing.

History
Census 2011 Jhikardanga Village Location Code or Village Code 319806. The village of Jhikardanga is located in the Bhatar tehsil of Burdwan district in West Bengal, India.

Transport 

Population 
Jhikardanga village of Barddhaman has substantial population of Schedule Caste. Schedule Caste (SC) constitutes 29.22% of total population in Jhikardanga village. The village Jhikardanga currently doesn't have any Schedule Tribe (ST) population.

Population and house data

Healthcare
Nearest Rural Hospital at Bhatar (with 60 beds) is the main medical facility in Bhatar CD block. There are primary health centers..

School
JHIKARDANGA S.S.R.K. F.P. SCHOOL.

References 

Villages in Purba Bardhaman district
West Bengal articles missing geocoordinate data